FC Zimbru Chișinău is a Moldovan football club based in Chișinău, the capital of Moldova. They play in the Divizia Naţională, the top division in Moldovan football. They play their home games at Zimbru Stadium which has a capacity of 10,500. During the 2014/15 campaign they will compete in the following competitions: Divizia Națională, Moldovan Cup, Supercup, Uefa Europa League.

Competitions

Super Cup

Divizia Națională

Results summary

Results

League table

Moldovan Cup

UEFA Europa League

Qualifying rounds

Squad statistics

Appearances and goals

|-
|colspan="14"|Players who left Zimbru Chișinău during the season:
|-
|colspan="14"|Players who appeared for Zimbru Chișinău no longer at the club:
|}

Goal scorers

Disciplinary record

See also
 2009–10 FC Zimbru Chișinău season

References

External links
 Official website 
 Profile at soccerway.com 
 Zimbru Chișinău  at weltfussballarchiv.com
 Zimbru Chișinău supporters website - general
 Zimbru Chișinău supporters website - ”OASTEA FIARĂ” 
 Zimbru Chișinău supporters website - ”ULTRABOYS”
 Zimbru Chișinău at DiviziaNationala.com 

Moldovan football clubs 2014–15 season
FC Zimbru Chișinău seasons